Shandon Rodriguez Anderson (born December 31, 1973) is an American former professional basketball player who played in the National Basketball Association (NBA) from 1996 to 2006. Growing up in Atlanta, Anderson attended the University of Georgia and played for four teams during his ten-year NBA career after being drafted by the Utah Jazz in 1996: the Jazz, Houston Rockets, New York Knicks, and Miami Heat. He played the shooting guard and small forward positions.

Anderson attended Alonzo A. Crim High School in Atlanta, then played basketball at the University of Georgia. He was drafted in the second round (54th overall) of the 1996 NBA draft by the Utah Jazz, and played for the Jazz, the Houston Rockets, the New York Knicks and the Heat. His best season was in 1999–2000, when he averaged 12.3 points per game with the Rockets. His career average is 7.8 points per game.

He is the younger brother of former Knicks and Heat player Willie Anderson.

Anderson won an NBA championship in 2006 with the Miami Heat as a backup, and subsequently retired.

External links
Basketball-Reference.com: Shandon Anderson
ESPN.com: Shandon Anderson
NBA.com Profile: Shandon Anderson

References 

1973 births
Living people
American men's basketball players
Basketball players from Atlanta
Georgia Bulldogs basketball players
Houston Rockets players
Miami Heat players
New York Knicks players
Shooting guards
Small forwards
Utah Jazz draft picks
Utah Jazz players